Gianni Daniel Rodríguez Fernández (born 7 June 1994) is a Uruguayan professional footballer who plays as a left back.

Club career
Born in Montevideo, Rodríguez joined the youth system of Danubio F.C. in 2010. In 2012, he joined the senior team, playing 12 matches in 2012–13 Primera División, and 2 matches in 2012 Copa Sudamericana.

In 2013, Rodríguez joined Portuguese club S.L. Benfica, being assigned to the reserve team in Segunda Liga. There, he played 3 matches in the 2012–13 campaign, and 21 matches in 2013–2014. In 2014–15 he was inactive, not being part of the B team.

On 5 February 2015, it was announced that Rodríguez had been loaned to Peñarol. He subsequently represented Cerro, Sud América, Fénix and Argentine side San Martín de San Juan before joining Spanish side UD Almería on 18 July 2019.

On 28 August 2019, however, Rodríguez terminated his contract with the Andalusians after the club's change of ownership.

On 16 February 2020, Armenian Premier League club Lori FC announced the signing of Rodríguez on a one-year contract. He left Lori on 25 September 2020 to join CD El Ejido in Spain on a deal until the end of the season. However, the deal was terminated by mutual agreement in the beginning of January 2021.

Honours
Uruguay
 FIFA U-17 World Cup: Runner-up 2011
 FIFA U-20 World Cup: Runner-up 2013

References

External links
 Penãrol official profile 
 Benfica official profile 
 
 

1994 births
Living people
Footballers from Montevideo
Uruguayan footballers
Uruguayan expatriate footballers
Association football defenders
Danubio F.C. players
S.L. Benfica B players
Peñarol players
C.A. Cerro players
Sud América players
San Martín de San Juan footballers
UD Almería players
FC Lori players
CD El Ejido players
Argentine Primera División players
Uruguayan Primera División players
Liga Portugal 2 players
Armenian Premier League players
Uruguay under-20 international footballers
Expatriate footballers in Argentina
Expatriate footballers in Portugal
Expatriate footballers in Spain
Expatriate footballers in Armenia
Uruguayan expatriate sportspeople in Portugal
Uruguayan expatriate sportspeople in Argentina
Uruguayan expatriate sportspeople in Spain
Pan American Games medalists in football
Pan American Games bronze medalists for Uruguay
Footballers at the 2011 Pan American Games
Medalists at the 2011 Pan American Games